The 1977 Connecticut Huskies football team represented the University of Connecticut in the 1977 NCAA Division II football season.  The Huskies were led by first year head coach Walt Nadzak, and completed the season with a record of 1–10.

Schedule

References

Connecticut
UConn Huskies football seasons
Connecticut Huskies football